Central Market station is a station on Line 01 and Line 03 of the Phnom Penh BRT bus rapid transit network in Phnom Penh, Cambodia, located on Monivong Boulevard. It is located outside of the Central Market.

See also
 Phnom Penh City Bus
 Transport in Phnom Penh
 Line 01 (Phnom Penh Bus Rapid Transit)
 Line 03 (Phnom Penh Bus Rapid Transit)

External links
 Official Page of Phnom Penh Municipal Bus Services

Phnom Penh Bus Rapid Transit stations